The 2016 International Supermodified Association  is the 40th season of the International Supermodified Association. The series began with the Jack Murphy Memorial at Oswego Speedway on May 28, and ended with the World Series of Racing at Thompson Speedway Motorsports Park on October 16. Dave Shullick Jr. is the defending champion.

References

International Supermodified Association
International Supermodified Association